Klaus Eberhard may refer to:

Klaus Eberhard (skier) (born 1956), Austrian alpine skier
Klaus Eberhard (tennis) (born 1957), West German tennis player